Olárizu is the name of a meadow area and hill in the province of Álava, Spain, in the outskirts of Vitoria-Gasteiz. The name was given originally to a now deserted village in the fourteenth century.

Since the nineteenth century, its fields have become popular as part  of a procession and festivity to honor the Virgin on the Monday after September 8. 

Geography of Álava